The Order of National Artists of the Philippines (Filipino: Orden ng mga Pambansang Alagad ng Sining ng Pilipinas) is an order bestowed by the Philippines on Filipinos who have made significant contributions to the development of Philippine art. Members of the Order are known as National Artists. Originally instituted as an Award, it was elevated to the status of an order in 2003.

The Order is administered by the Cultural Center of the Philippines by virtue of President Ferdinand Marcos's Proclamation № 1001 of April 2, 1972, and the National Commission for Culture and the Arts. The first Award was posthumously conferred on Filipino painter Fernando Amorsolo.

Definition 
The order of the highest state honor is conferred on individuals deemed as having done much for their artistic field. Deserving individuals must have been recommended by both the Cultural Center and the National Commission for Culture and the Arts prior to receiving the Award. Such people are then titled, by virtue of a Presidential Proclamation, as National Artist (Filipino: Gawad Pambansang Alagad ng Sining), and are inducted into the Order.

Categories
Categories under which National Artists can be recognized originally included:
Music – singing, composition, direction, and/or performance;
Dance – choreography, direction and/or performance;
Theater – direction, performance and/or production design;
Contemporary Arts – painting, sculpture, printmaking, photography, installation art, mixed media works, illustration, graphic arts, performance art and/or imaging;
Literature – poetry, fiction, essay, playwriting, journalism and/or literary criticism;
Film and Broadcasting/Broadcast Arts – direction, writing, production design, cinematography, editing, camera work, and/or performance; and
Architecture, Design and Allied Arts – architecture design, interior design, industrial arts design, landscape architecture and fashion design.

However, National Artists have since been honored under new categories. The NCCA created the category of National Artist for Fashion Design when it nominated Ramon Valera, but subsumed that category under "Architecture, Design and Allied Arts". President Fidel V. Ramos issued an executive order creating the category of National Artist for Historical Literature before conferring the honor to Carlos Quirino.

Criteria 
The National Artist of the Philippines are based on a broad criteria, as set forth by the Cultural Center of the Philippines and the National Commission on Culture and the Arts:
 Living artists who have been Filipino citizens for the last ten years prior to nomination as well as those who have died after the establishment of the Award in 1972 but were Filipino citizens at the time of their death;
 Artists who have helped build a Filipino sense of nationhood through the content and form of their works;
 Artists who have distinguished themselves by pioneering in a mode of creative expression or style, making an impact on succeeding generations of artists;
 Artists who have created a significant body of works and/or have consistently displayed excellence in the practice of their art form, enriching artistic expression or style; and
 Artists who enjoy broad acceptance through prestigious national and/or international recognition, Award in prestigious national and/or international events, critical acclaim and/or reviews of their works, and/or respect and esteem from peers within an artistic discipline.

Nominations are then submitted to the National Artist Secretariat that is created by the National Artist Award Committee; experts from the different art fields then sit on a First Deliberation to prepare the short list of nominees. A Second Deliberation, which is a joint meeting of the Commissioners of the NCCA and the Board of Trustees of the CCP, decides on the final nominees. The list is then forwarded to the President of the Philippines, who, by Presidential Proclamation, proclaims the final nominees as members of the Order of National Artists.

Benefits 
The rank and title of National Artist, as proclaimed by the President of the Philippines;
A grand collar of the Order of National Artist and a citation;
A lifetime emolument and material and physical benefits comparable in value to those received by the highest officers of the land such as:
a cash Award of one hundred thousand pesos (₱100,000.00) net of taxes, for living awardees;
a cash Award of seventy-five thousand pesos (₱75,000.00) net of taxes, for posthumous awardees, payable to legal heir/s;
a monthly life pension, medical and hospitalization benefits;
life insurance coverage for Awardees who are still insurable;
a state funeral and burial at the Libingan ng mga Bayani;
a place of honor, in line with protocolar precedence, at national state functions, and recognition at cultural events.

The Roster of National Artists

In May 2006, under the Arroyo administration, the National Commission on Culture and the Arts (NCCA) already conferred the award to Poe but the late actor's wife, Susan Roces refused to acknowledge it. President Aquino has approved and signed Proclamation 435 affirming the previous proclamation of former President Gloria Macapagal-Arroyo declaring the late movie icon Fernando Poe Jr. a National Artist, posthumously. The Poe family finally accepted the conferment on 16 August 2012. .

Aguilar Alcuaz, Francisco, and Conde were all proclaimed in 2009 but the conferment of the order was delayed due to a controversy. The order was finally bestowed in a ceremony at Malacañang Palace in November 2013.

Music 
Levi Celério
Ernani Joson Cuenco
Felipe Padilla de León
Francisco Feliciano
Lucrecia R. Kasilag
José Maceda
Antonio J. Molina
Lucio D. San Pedro
Ramón Santos
Andrea O. Veneración
Antonino R. Buenaventura
Jovita Fuentes
Ryan Cayabyab
Fides Cuyugan-Asensio
Dance 
Francisca Reyes Aquino
Leonor Orosa-Goquingco
Ramón Obusan
Alice Reyes
Lucrecia Reyes Urtula
Agnes Locsin
Theater 
Daisy Avellana
Honorata "Atang" de la Rama
Rolando S. Tínio
Salvador F. Bernál (Set Design)
Lamberto V. Avellana
Wilfrido Ma. Guerrero
Severino Montano
Amelia Lapeña-Bonifacio
Tony Mabesa
Architecture, Design, and Allied Arts 
Pablo Antonio (Architecture)
Juan Nakpíl (Architecture)
Leandro V. Locsín (Architecture)
Francisco Mañosa (Architecture)
I. P. Santos (Architecture)
Ramón Valera (Fashion Design)
José María Zaragoza (Architecture)
Salvacion Lim-Higgins (Fashion Design)
Historical Literature 
Carlos Quirino

Visual Arts 
Napoleón V. Abueva (Sculpture)
Larry Alcala (Comics)
Fernando C. Amorsolo (Painting)
Benedicto "BenCab" Reyes Cabrera (Painting)
Francisco Coching (Comics)
Victorio C. Edades (Painting)
Carlos "Botong" V. Francisco (Painting)
Abdulmari Asia Imao (Sculpture)
José T. Joya (Painting)
Ang Kiukok (Painting)
César Legaspi (Painting)
Arturo R. Luz (Painting)
Vicente S. Manansala (Painting)
J. Navarro Elizalde (Painting)
Hernándo R. Ocampo (Painting)
Guillermo E. Tolentino (Sculpture)
Federico Aguilar Alcuáz (Painting, Sculpture, and Mixed Media)
Literature 
Francisco Arcellana
Virgilio S. Almario
Cirilo F. Bautista
N. V. M. Gonzalez
Ramon Muzones
Amado V. Hernández
Nick Joaquín
F. Sioníl José
Bienvenido Lumbera
Resil Mojares
Alejándro R. Roces
Carlos P. Rómulo
Edith L. Tiempo
José García Villa
Lázaro Francisco
Gemino Abad
Film and Broadcast Arts
Lino Brocka
Ishmael Bernál
Gerardo de León
Eddie S. Romero
Fernando Poe Jr.
Manuel Conde
Kidlat Tahimik
Nora Aunor
Marilou Diaz-Abaya
Ricky Lee

2009 National Artist of the Philippines controversy 

In August 2009, the conferment of the Order of National Artists on seven individuals by President Gloria Macapagal Arroyo became controversial when it was revealed that musician Ramon Santos had been dropped from the list of nominees short-listed in May that year by the selection committee, and that four other individuals had been nominated via "President’s prerogative": Cecilla Guidote-Alvarez (Theater), Carlo J. Caparas (Visual Arts and Film), Francisco Mañosa (Architecture), and Pitoy Moreno (Fashion Design).

Members of the Philippine art community–including a number of living members of the Order–protested that the proclamation politicised the title of National Artist, and made it "a way for President Gloria Macapagal-Arroyo to accommodate her allies." Specific protests were raised regarding the nomination of Guidote-Alvarez, who was also Executive Director of the National Commission for Culture and the Arts, because it was purportedly a breach of protocol and delicadeza (propriety), and of Caparas, on the grounds that he was unqualified for nomination under both the Visual Arts and the Film categories. On July 16, 2013, the controversy finally ended after the Supreme Court of the Philippines voted 12-1-2 that voided the four proclamations.

On June 20, 2014, five years after he was originally shortlisted in 2009, Ramon Santos was finally conferred National Artist for Music by President Benigno S. Aquino III.

See also
 Art of the Philippines
 Culture of the Philippines
 National Living Treasures Award (Philippines)
 Tourism in the Philippines

References

External links
 List of National Artists (NCCA). From the National Commission on Culture and the Arts (NCCA) website.
 National Artists Guidelines (NCCA)
 The Order of National Artists – from the Official Gazette of the Philippines (Office of the President)
 National Artists in Waiting: Six in a Fix

 
Philippines
Orders, decorations, and medals of the Philippines
 01
Establishments by Philippine presidential decree